The following radio stations broadcast on FM frequency 95.1 MHz:

Argentina
 LRM945 Esperanza in Venado Tuerto, Santa Fe
 LRP756 Estilo in San Justo, Santa Fe
 Metro 95.1  in Buenos Aires
 KISS FM  in Rosario, Santa Fe
 Estacion Isla Verde in Isla Verde, Córdoba
 Radio María in Belén, Catamarca
 Radio María in San Carlos de Bariloche, Río Negro

Australia
 2MIA in Griffith, New South Wales
 2PNN in Port Stephens, New South Wales
 4ROM in Roma, Queensland
 4RGK in Gladstone, Queensland
 3PNN in Latrobe Valley, Victoria

Belize
LOVE FM

Canada (Channel 236)

China 
 CNR The Voice of China in Mianyang

Greece
Kosmoradio In Thessaloniki
Ionian Radio 95.1 In Parta

Indonesia
 PM2FHN in Jakarta, Indonesia

Ireland
 WLR-FM in County Waterford

Malaysia
 Manis FM in Kuantan, Pahang

Mexico
XHAPM-FM in Apatzingán, Michoacán
XHBC-FM in Ciudad Guzmán, Jalisco
XHBCPZ-FM in La Paz, Baja California Sur
XHBOC-FM in Bocoyna-San Juanito, Chihuahua

XHEL-FM in Fresnillo, Zacatecas
XHFJ-FM in Teziutlán, Puebla
XHJRS-FM in Jalpa, Zacatecas
XHLX-FM in Zitácuaro, Michoacán
XHMAI-FM in Mapastepec, Chiapas
XHNH-FM in Irapuato, Guanajuato
XHPFCP-FM in Felipe Carrillo Puerto, Quintana Roo
XHSQB-FM in San Quintín, Baja California

Paraguay
ZPV1 at Asunción

Philippines
DWRW in San Fernando City, Pampanga
DXPS in Cotabato City
DWMB in Baguio City
DWKI in Lucena City
DYQS in Puerto Princesa City
DWQJ in Naga City
DYIC-FM in Iloilo City
DXMB-FM in Butuan City
DYTX in Tacloban City
DXZD in Iligan City
DXKS-FM in Tagum City

Trinidad and Tobago
 95 The Ultimate One, broadcasts from Port of Spain, Trinidad and Tobago and available Nationwide.

United Kingdom
BBC Radio Manchester

United States (Channel 236)

References

Lists of radio stations by frequency